Ernest Newton (October 2, 1925–April 4, 1996) was an American actor and voice actor who has been seen and heard in several roles including that of Pierre the French Parrot in the Disneyland attraction Walt Disney's Enchanted Tiki Room.

Filmography
Swing Fever (1943)
Shady Lady (1945)
Aaron Slick from Punkin Crick (1952)
With a Song in My Heart (1952)
Brigadoon (1954)
Hey There, It's Yogi Bear (1964)

References

External links
 

1925 births
1996 deaths
American male voice actors
Place of birth missing
20th-century American male actors